Andrey Fonseca (born 8 April 1993) is a Costa Rican cyclist. He rode at the cross-country event at the 2016 Summer Olympics.

References

1993 births
Living people
Costa Rican male cyclists
Cyclists at the 2016 Summer Olympics
Olympic cyclists of Costa Rica
Cyclists at the 2015 Pan American Games
Cyclists at the 2019 Pan American Games
Pan American Games competitors for Costa Rica
21st-century Costa Rican people
Competitors at the 2014 Central American and Caribbean Games